Carn nan Gobhar may refer to:

Càrn nan Gobhar (Mullardoch), a mountain on the northern side of Loch Mullardoch in the upper part of Glen Cannich
Càrn nan Gobhar (Strathfarrar), a mountain on the northern side of Glen Strathfarrar